Ikorodu United F.C. is a football club based in Lagos. In 2015/2016, Ikorodu United played in the Nigeria Premier League after gaining consecutive promotions from the Nigeria Nationwide League and Nigeria National League.
Ikorodu United FC were held to a 1–1 draw by Abia Warriors FC in their first ever Nigerian Professional Football league fixture in the history of the club on  Match day 1 on home soil at the 10,000-capacity Onikan Stadium, Lagos State.

Stadium
The 5,000 capacity Onikan Stadium is the home ground of Ikorodu United F.C.

Current squad

References

2014 establishments in Nigeria
Sports clubs in Nigeria
Sport in Lagos

Football clubs in Lagos